Roads to Koktebel is a 2003 Russian adventure drama film directed by Boris Khlebnikov and Aleksey Popogrebskiy.

Plot
A Boy with his Father go to the sea. They come in a freight car in the trucker's cabin. They go from house to house, by forest, by field. In Moscow they have nothing left. And there, by the sea is hope of a new happy life beginning. For the Father, the road is an attempt to regain faith in himself, and the friendship and trust of his son. The Boy's target objective is the Koktebel village, where in the hills near the sea a wind is constantly blowing, where the albatross soars.

Cast
 Gleb Puskepalis as The Son
 Igor Chernevich as The Father
 Evgeniy Sytyy as Railway inspector
 Vera Sandrykina as Tanya
 Vladimir Kucherenko as Mikhail
 Agrippina Steklova as Kseniya
 Aleksandr Ilin as Truck driver
 Anna Frolovtseva as Tenant

Awards
It was entered into the 25th Moscow International Film Festival where it won the Special Silver St. George. It also won the FIPRESCI prize in Moscow.

At the Karlovy Vary International Film Festival the film won the Philip Morris Film Prize (Boris Khlebnikov, Aleksey Popogrebskiy).

References

External links
 

2003 films
2000s adventure drama films
Russian adventure drama films
2000s Russian-language films
Films set in Crimea
Films directed by Alexei Popogrebski